Eric Moss (September 25, 1974  – March 10, 2019) was a professional American football player.

Moss played college football at Ohio State University. He was an offensive tackle for the Minnesota Vikings in 1997 (but did not appear in a game),  and then played guard for the Scottish Claymores in the NFL Europe League in 1999.

Moss was the half brother of Pro Football Hall of Fame wide receiver Randy Moss.

References 

1974 births
2019 deaths
People from Kanawha County, West Virginia
Players of American football from West Virginia
American football offensive tackles
American football offensive guards
Ohio State Buckeyes football players
Scottish Claymores players